Joel or Yoel is a name meaning "Yahweh Is God" and may refer to:

 Joel (given name), including a list of people named Joel or Yoel
 Joel (surname), a surname
 Joel (footballer, born 1904), Joel de Oliveira Monteiro, Brazilian football goalkeeper
 Joel (footballer, born 1980), Joel Bertoti Padilha, Brazilian football centre-back
 Joel (prophet), a prophet of ancient Israel
 Book of Joel, a book in the Jewish Tanakh, and in the Christian Bible, ascribed to the prophet
 Joel, Georgia, a community in the United States
 Joel, Wisconsin, a community in the United States